 

Werner Hermann Karl Ebeling (21 November 1913  – 25 August 2008) was an officer in the Wehrmacht of Nazi Germany during World War II and a general in the  Bundeswehr of West Germany. He was a recipient of the  Knight's Cross of the Iron Cross with Oak Leaves. He commanded the 11 Panzergrenadier Division of the Bundeswehr from 15 January 1968 to 30 September 1970.

Awards and decorations
 Iron Cross (1939) 2nd Class (14 June 1940) & 1st Class  (5 September 1941)
 Wound Badge in Black (18 March 1944)
 Infantry Assault Badge (13 November 1941)
 Eastern Front Medal (31 July 1942)
 Close Combat Clasp  in Bronze (25 February 1944)
 Honour Roll Clasp of the Army (27 December 1943)
 German Cross in Gold on 11 March 1943 as Oberleutnant in Grenadier-Regiment 220
 Knight's Cross of the Iron Cross with Oak Leaves
 Knight's Cross on 9 April 1944 as Major and commander of the II./Grenadier-Regiment 220
 Oak Leaves on 5 March 1945 as Oberst and commander of Grenadier-Regiment 154
  Great Cross of Merit of the Federal Republic of Germany (22 July 1970)

References

Citations

Bibliography

 
 
 

1913 births
2008 deaths
People from Stade
People from the Province of Hanover
Recipients of the Gold German Cross
Recipients of the Knight's Cross of the Iron Cross with Oak Leaves
Commanders Crosses of the Order of Merit of the Federal Republic of Germany
Military personnel from Lower Saxony
Major generals of the German Army